Les Mauvaises fréquentations (En. Bad Company) is a 1963 short drama film written and directed by Jean Eustache. It stars Aristide and Daniel Bart.

External links

1963 films
French drama films
1960s French-language films
1963 drama films
1960s French films